The 177th Fighter Wing (177 FW) is a unit of the New Jersey Air National Guard, stationed at Atlantic City Air National Guard Base, New Jersey. If activated to federal service, the Wing is gained by the United States Air Force Air Combat Command.

The 119th Fighter Squadron assigned to the Wings 177th Operations Group, is a descendant organization of the World War I 5th Aviation School Squadron (later 119th Aero Squadron), established on 5 June 1917. It was reformed on 30 January 1930, as the 119th Observation Squadron, and is one of the 29 original National Guard Observation Squadrons of the United States Army National Guard formed before World War II.

Mission
Federal Mission: provide combat-ready citizen airmen, aircraft and equipment for worldwide deployment in support of United States Air Force objectives.

State Mission: support the citizens of New Jersey by protecting life and property, preserving the peace, order, and public safety when called upon by the Governor.

Units
 Headquarters 177th Fighter Wing
 177th Operations Group
 119th Fighter Squadron
 227th Air Support Operations Squadron
177th Operations Support Squadron
177th Fighter Wing Detachment 1, Warren Grove Gunnery Range
 177th Maintenance Group
 177th Aircraft Maintenance Squadron
 177th Maintenance Operations Flight
 177th Maintenance Squadron
 177th Medical Group
 177th Mission Support Group
 177th Civil Engineering Squadron
 177th Communications Flight
 177th Force Support Squadron
 177th Logistics Readiness Squadron
 177th Security Forces Squadron

History

Tactical Air Command
On 15 October 1962, the New Jersey Air National Guard 119th Tactical Fighter Squadron was authorized to expand to a group level, and the 177th Tactical Fighter Group was established by the National Guard Bureau. The 119th TFS became the group's flying squadron. Other squadrons assigned into the group were the 117th Headquarters, 117th Material Squadron (Maintenance), 177th Combat Support Squadron, and the 177th USAF Dispensary.

In January 1968, a new crisis, the seizure of the American ship USS Pueblo by North Korean forces, and the 119th was called to active duty. In May 1968, the 119th TFS was assigned to the 113th Tactical Fighter Wing, District of Columbia Air National Guard and stationed at Myrtle Beach AFB, South Carolina when the active-duty 354th TFW was deployed to South Korea. Group personnel were spread throughout the United States, Taiwan, South Korea, and South Vietnam.  The 177th TFW was placed in non-operational status.  The 177th TFG was reformed at Atlantic City airport in June 1969, and returned to New Jersey State control.   The 119th TFS transitioned into the F-105 "Thunderchief" in 1970.

Air Defense mission

In 1972, the National Guard Bureau announced that the 177 TFG would be assigned to the Aerospace Defense Command (ADCOM) and be responsible for protecting the United States from airborne attacks, and so was re-designated as the 177th Fighter-Interceptor Group and 119th Fighter-Interceptor Squadron. In 1973, the unit transitioned to the F-106 "Delta Dart" all-weather interceptor and assumed alert status the following year. In 1979 Aerospace Defense Command was inactivated and the group was reassigned to Air Defense Tactical Air Command (ADTAC), and then again changed to a numbered Air Force, First Air Force in 1985.

October 1984, the 177th FIG participated in the air defense community's Worldwide Weapons Meet, known as "William Tell", at Tyndall AFB, Florida. The unit captured the Special Achievement Award for Professionalism and Team Spirit, Overall Best Looking Aircraft, Best F-106 Team, Major Richard I. Bong Fighter Interceptor Award, Top Gun Award, F-106 Category Best Looking Aircraft Award, the Pratt and Whitney Award, the Sperry Corporation Award, and the General Dynamics Corporation Award.

In July 1988 the 177th started receiving their first F-16 Fighting Falcons, a compact, multi-role fighter aircraft. The initial F-16A/B's were of the Block 15 type, replacing the aging F-106 in the air defense role. Since this was the primary role of the unit, it was decided to upgrade these airframes with the Air Defense Fighter (ADF) variant.  To that date the unit also flew some F-106s aside the F-16. The 119th FS was the last USAF unit to withdraw the F-106 from operational duty. In 1994 the squadron started trading in their ADF version of the Falcon for the more advanced block 25 version. In September 2007 the first USAF F-16Cs to be retired to AMARG were from the 119th FS who sent two to the desert boneyard. Replacing the aging block 25s were the not much newer block 30s. During this transition the mission of the squadron remained. This being a double task as an air defense squadron in the northern section of the US and as a multirole squadron to carry out contingency operations abroad.

During Operation Desert Shield/Storm, 73 members of the 177 FIG were called to active duty, and others served as volunteers. Fire fighters and Food Services personnel from the 177th Civil Engineering Squadron, elements of the 177th USAF Clinic, members of the Transportation section of the 177th Resource Management Squadron, and Explosive Ordnance Disposal personnel from the Consolidated Aircraft Maintenance Squadron provided backfill at various bases whose members had been deployed to Saudi Arabia. Those activated from the 177th Security Police Flight served at home station. And the 177th Chaplain's Assistant completed a five-month tour of active duty in Saudi Arabia. All members were returned to normal Guard status at home base by July 1991.

Since October 1998, the wing has had an active involvement in Operation Noble Eagle, Operation Southern Watch, Operation Northern Watch, Operation Enduring Freedom, Operation Iraqi Freedom, Operation Freedom's Sentinel, and Operation Inherent Resolve.

From 1 May through 13 June 1998, the wing deployed five F-16C Fighting Falcon aircraft and 46 personnel to Howard AFB, Panama, in support of OPERATION CORONET NIGHTHAWK. 130 personnel rotated on a two-week basis during the six-week deployment. Operating as part of a joint interagency task force, the wing's role was to detect and identify suspected drug smuggling aircraft. Once identified, the suspected aircraft are turned over to law enforcement agencies for apprehension.

As a result of the September 11 attacks on the United States in 2001 the Wing found itself in a key position. Located between New York and Washington DC, the 119th FS was immediately tasked with providing combat air patrols over cities in its region. In fact three aircraft were scrambled to intercept the aircraft that impacted the Pentagon, but were too late. They were then vectored to intercept flight 93 which eventually crashed in Pennsylvania. Although these three pilots did not know it at the time they would have been given authorization to down the airliners once intercepted. Following the attacks, the 119th FS began flying missions for Operation Noble Eagle. On 12 July 2002 the squadron flew its 1000th mission for Operation Nobel Eagle. From that year they also started to contribute in other overseas contingency operations.

The Fighter Wing has earned numerous awards to include the Air Force Outstanding Unit Award for the 2016-2017 and the 2018-2019 periods. In 2019, the 177th Aircraft Maintenance Squadron (AMXS) was recognized as the Air National Guard top maintenance unit when it won the Category 1 Maintenance Effectiveness Award. The 177th Medical Group earned the Air Force Outstanding Unit Award in 2009.

Lineage
 Designated 177th Tactical Fighter Group, and allotted to New Jersey ANG, 1962
 Extended federal recognition and activated, 15 October 1962
 Placed in Non-Operational Status, 26 January 1968 – 18 June 1969
 Re-designated: 177th Fighter-Interceptor Group, 27 Jan 1973
 Re-designated: 177th Fighter Group, 15 Mar 1992
 Status changed from Group to Wing, 11 October 1995
 Re-designated: 177th Fighter Wing, 11 October 1995

Assignments
 New Jersey Air National Guard, 15 October 1962
 Gained by: Tactical Air Command
 Gained by: Aerospace Defense Command, 27 January 1973
 Gained by: Air Defense, Tactical Air Command, 1 October 1979
 Gained by: First Air Force, Tactical Air Command, 6 December 1985
 Attached to: Northeast Air Defense Sector, 1 July 1987
 Attached to: Northeast Air Defense Sector (ANG), 1 December 1994
 Attached to: Eastern Air Defense Sector, 15 July 2009-Present

Components
 177th Operations Group, 11 October 1995 – Present
 119th Tactical Fighter (later Fighter-Interceptor, later Fighter) Squadron, 15 October 1962 – 26 January 1968; 18 June 1969 – 11 October 1995
 Assigned to 177th OG, 11 October 1995-Present

Stations
 National Aviation Facilities Experimental Center, Atlantic City, New Jersey, 15 October 1962 – 26 January 1968; 18 June 1969
 Designated: Atlantic City Air National Guard Base, New Jersey, 1991-Present

Aircraft

F-16C/D Fighting Falcon (1994 – present)
F-16A ADF Fighting Falcon (1988–1994)
F-106A/B Delta Dart (1973–1988)

F-105B Thunderchief (1970–1973)
F-100C Super Sabre (1963–1970)
F-86H Sabre (1962–1963)

References

177th Fighter Wing at GlobalSecurity.org

External links
 New Jersey ANG: 177th Fighter Wing

Wings of the United States Air National Guard
177
Military units and formations in New Jersey